Sierra Blanca may refer to:
Sierra Blanca (Colorado), a mountain range
Sierra Blanca (New Mexico), a mountain range
Sierra Blanca (Andalusia), a mountain range near Málaga, Spain
Sierra Blanca, Texas, a census-designated place